Communicate! is the first studio album by soul band The Solution formed by Nicke Andersson and Scott Morgan recorded at Atlantis Studio and mixed in Polar Studios. The album was released in 2004 and was followed up with Will Not Be Televised in 2008.

Track listing

Personnel
Scott Morgan – lead vocals, guitar, harmonica
Nicke Andersson – production, drums, percussion, guitar, backing vocals 
Henke "The Duke of Honk" Wilden – piano, organ 
Jim Heneghan – bass guitar
Mattias Hellberg – rhythm guitar, lead guitar
Linn Segolson – backing vocals
Clarisse Muvemba – backing vocals
Cecilia Gärding – backing vocals
Jennifer Strömberg – backing vocals
Linnea Sporre – backing vocals
Gustav Bendt – saxofon
Emil Strandberg – trumpet
Robert Dahlqvist – lead guitar on Soulmover
Henrik Jonsson – mastering
Janne Hansson – recording engineer
Ronny Lahti – recording engineer

References

External links
 Communicate! on Myspace
Scoot Morgan – The Solution
Official Site

2004 debut albums